A blood type (also known as a blood group) is  a classification of blood, based on the presence and absence of antibodies and inherited antigenic substances on the surface of red blood cells (RBCs). These antigens may be proteins, carbohydrates, glycoproteins, or glycolipids, depending on the blood group system. Some of these antigens are also present on the surface of other types of cells of various tissues. Several of these red blood cell surface antigens can stem from one allele (or an alternative version of a gene) and collectively form a blood group system.

Blood types are inherited and represent contributions from both parents of an individual. , a total of 43 human blood group systems are recognized by the International Society of Blood Transfusion (ISBT). The two most important blood group systems are ABO and Rh; they determine someone's blood type (A, B, AB, and O, with + or − denoting RhD status) for suitability in blood transfusion.

Blood group systems

A complete blood type would describe each of the 43 blood groups, and an individual's blood type is one of many possible combinations of blood-group antigens. Almost always, an individual has the same blood group for life, but very rarely an individual's blood type changes through addition or suppression of an antigen in infection, malignancy, or autoimmune disease. Another more common cause of blood type change is a bone marrow transplant. Bone-marrow transplants are performed for many leukemias and lymphomas, among other diseases. If a person receives bone marrow from someone of a different ABO type (e.g., a type A patient receives a type O bone marrow), the patient's blood type should eventually become the donor's type, as the patient's hematopoietic stem cells (HSCs) are destroyed, either by ablation of the bone marrow or by the donor's T-cells. Once all the patient's original red blood cells have died, they will have been fully replaced by new cells derived from the donor HSCs. Provided the donor had a different ABO type, the new cells' surface antigens will be different from those on the surface of the patient's original red blood cells.

Some blood types are associated with inheritance of other diseases; for example, the Kell antigen is sometimes associated with McLeod syndrome. Certain blood types may affect susceptibility to infections, an example being the resistance to specific malaria species seen in individuals lacking the Duffy antigen. The Duffy antigen, presumably as a result of natural selection, is less common in population groups from areas having a high incidence of malaria.

ABO blood group system

The ABO blood group system involves two antigens and two antibodies found in human blood. The two antigens are antigen A and antigen B. The two antibodies are antibody A and antibody B. The antigens are present on the red blood cells and the antibodies in the serum. Regarding the antigen property of the blood all human beings can be classified into four groups, those with antigen A (group A), those with antigen B (group B), those with both antigen A and B (group AB) and those with neither antigen (group O). The antibodies present together with the antigens are found as follows:
 Antigen A with antibody B
 Antigen B with antibody A
 Antigen AB with neither antibody A nor B
 Antigen null (group O) with both antibody A and B

There is an agglutination reaction between similar antigen and antibody (for example, antigen A agglutinates the antibody A and antigen B agglutinates the antibody B). Thus, transfusion can be considered safe as long as the serum of the recipient does not contain antibodies for the blood cell antigens of the donor.

The ABO system is the most important blood-group system in human-blood transfusion. The associated anti-A and anti-B antibodies are usually immunoglobulin M, abbreviated IgM, antibodies. It has been hypothesized that ABO IgM antibodies are produced in the first years of life by sensitization to environmental substances such as food, bacteria, and viruses, although blood group compatibility rules are applied to newborn and infants as a matter of practice. The original terminology used by Karl Landsteiner in 1901 for the classification was A/B/C; in later publications "C" became "O". Type O is often called 0 (zero, or null) in other languages.

Rh blood group system

The Rh system (Rh meaning Rhesus) is the second most significant blood-group system in human-blood transfusion with currently 50 antigens. The most significant Rh antigen is the D antigen, because it is the most likely to provoke an immune system response of the five main Rh antigens. It is common for D-negative individuals not to have any anti-D IgG or IgM antibodies, because anti-D antibodies are not usually produced by sensitization against environmental substances. However, D-negative individuals can produce IgG anti-D antibodies following a sensitizing event: possibly a fetomaternal transfusion of blood from a fetus in pregnancy or occasionally a blood transfusion with D positive RBCs. Rh disease can develop in these cases. Rh negative blood types are much less common in Asian populations (0.3%) than they are in European populations (15%).

The presence or absence of the Rh(D) antigen is signified by the + or − sign, so that, for example, the A− group is ABO type A and does not have the Rh (D) antigen.

ABO and Rh distribution by country

As with many other genetic traits, the distribution of ABO and Rh blood groups varies significantly between populations.

Other blood group systems

, 41 blood-group systems have been identified by the International Society for Blood Transfusion in addition to the ABO and Rh systems. Thus, in addition to the ABO antigens and Rh antigens, many other antigens are expressed on the RBC surface membrane. For example, an individual can be AB, D positive, and at the same time M and N positive (MNS system), K positive (Kell system), Lea or Leb negative (Lewis system), and so on, being positive or negative for each blood group system antigen. Many of the blood group systems were named after the patients in whom the corresponding antibodies were initially encountered. Blood group systems other than ABO and Rh pose a potential, yet relatively low, risk of complications upon mixing of blood from different people.

Following is a comparison of clinically relevant characteristics of antibodies against the main human blood group systems:

Clinical significance

Blood transfusion

Transfusion medicine is a specialized branch of hematology that is concerned with the study of blood groups, along with the work of a blood bank to provide a transfusion service for blood and other blood products. Across the world, blood products must be prescribed by a medical doctor (licensed physician or surgeon) in a similar way as medicines.

Much of the routine work of a blood bank involves testing blood from both donors and recipients to ensure that every individual recipient is given blood that is compatible and is as safe as possible. If a unit of incompatible blood is transfused between a donor and recipient, a severe acute hemolytic reaction with hemolysis (RBC destruction), kidney failure and shock is likely to occur, and death is a possibility. Antibodies can be highly active and can attack RBCs and bind components of the complement system to cause massive hemolysis of the transfused blood.

Patients should ideally receive their own blood or type-specific blood products to minimize the chance of a transfusion reaction. It is also possible to use the patient's own blood for transfusion. This is called autologous blood transfusion, which is always compatible with the patient. The procedure of washing a patient's own red blood cells goes as follows: The patient's lost blood is collected and washed with a saline solution. The washing procedure yields concentrated washed red blood cells. The last step is reinfusing the packed red blood cells into the patient. There are multiple ways to wash red blood cells. The two main ways are centrifugation and filtration methods. This procedure can be performed with microfiltration devices like the Hemoclear filter. Risks can be further reduced by cross-matching blood, but this may be skipped when blood is required for an emergency. Cross-matching involves mixing a sample of the recipient's serum with a sample of the donor's red blood cells and checking if the mixture agglutinates, or forms clumps. If agglutination is not obvious by direct vision, blood bank technologist usually check for agglutination with a microscope. If agglutination occurs, that particular donor's blood cannot be transfused to that particular recipient.  In a blood bank it is vital that all blood specimens are correctly identified, so labelling has been standardized using a barcode system known as ISBT 128.

The blood group may be included on identification tags or on tattoos worn by military personnel, in case they should need an emergency blood transfusion. Frontline German Waffen-SS had blood group tattoos during World War II.

Rare blood types can cause supply problems for blood banks and hospitals. For example, Duffy-negative blood occurs much more frequently in people of African origin, and the rarity of this blood type in the rest of the population can result in a shortage of Duffy-negative blood for these patients.  Similarly, for RhD negative people there is a risk associated with travelling to parts of the world where supplies of RhD negative blood are rare, particularly East Asia, where blood services may endeavor to encourage Westerners to donate blood.

Hemolytic disease of the newborn (HDN)

A pregnant woman may carry a fetus with a blood type which is different from her own. Typically, this is an issue if a Rh- mother has a child with a Rh+ father, and the fetus ends up being Rh+ like the father. In those cases, the mother can make IgG blood group antibodies. This can happen if some of the fetus' blood cells pass into the mother's blood circulation (e.g. a small fetomaternal hemorrhage at the time of childbirth or obstetric intervention), or sometimes after a therapeutic blood transfusion.  This can cause Rh disease or other forms of hemolytic disease of the newborn (HDN) in the current pregnancy and/or subsequent pregnancies.  Sometimes this is lethal for the fetus; in these cases it is called hydrops fetalis. If a pregnant woman is known to have anti-D antibodies, the Rh blood type of a fetus can be tested by analysis of fetal DNA in maternal plasma to assess the risk to the fetus of Rh disease. One of the major advances of twentieth century medicine was to prevent this disease by stopping the formation of Anti-D antibodies by D negative mothers with an injectable medication called Rho(D) immune globulin. Antibodies associated with some blood groups can cause severe HDN, others can only cause mild HDN and others are not known to cause HDN.

Blood products 
To provide maximum benefit from each blood donation and to extend shelf-life, blood banks fractionate some whole blood into several products. The most common of these products are packed RBCs, plasma, platelets, cryoprecipitate, and fresh frozen plasma (FFP).  FFP is quick-frozen to retain the labile clotting factors V and VIII, which are usually administered to patients who have a potentially fatal clotting problem caused by a condition such as advanced liver disease, overdose of anticoagulant, or disseminated intravascular coagulation (DIC).

Units of packed red cells are made by removing as much of the plasma as possible from whole blood units.

Clotting factors synthesized by modern recombinant methods are now in routine clinical use for hemophilia, as the risks of infection transmission that occur with pooled blood products are avoided.

Red blood cell compatibility

 Blood group AB  individuals have both A and B antigens on the surface of their RBCs, and their blood plasma does not contain any antibodies against either A or B antigen. Therefore, an individual with type AB blood can receive blood from any group (with AB being preferable), but cannot donate blood to any group other than AB.  They are known as universal recipients.
 Blood group A  individuals have the A antigen on the surface of their RBCs, and blood serum containing IgM antibodies against the B antigen. Therefore, a group A individual can receive blood only from individuals of groups A or O (with A being preferable), and can donate blood to individuals with type A or AB.
 Blood group B  individuals have the B antigen on the surface of their RBCs, and blood serum containing IgM antibodies against the A antigen. Therefore, a group B individual can receive blood only from individuals of groups B or O (with B being preferable), and can donate blood to individuals with type B or AB.
 Blood group O (or blood group zero in some countries) individuals do not have either A or B antigens on the surface of their RBCs, and their blood serum contains IgM anti-A and anti-B antibodies. Therefore, a group O individual can receive blood only from a group O individual, but can donate blood to individuals of any ABO blood group (i.e., A, B, O or AB). If a patient needs an urgent blood transfusion, and if the time taken to process the recipient's blood would cause a detrimental delay, O negative blood can be issued. Because it is compatible with anyone, O negative blood is often overused and consequently is always in short supply. According to the American Association of Blood Banks and the British Chief Medical Officer's National Blood Transfusion Committee, the use of group O RhD negative red cells should be restricted to persons with O negative blood, women who might be pregnant, and emergency cases in which blood-group testing is genuinely impracticable.

Table note
1. Assumes absence of atypical antibodies that would cause an incompatibility between donor and recipient blood, as is usual for blood selected by cross matching.

An Rh D-negative patient who does not have any anti-D antibodies (never being previously sensitized to D-positive RBCs) can receive a transfusion of D-positive blood once, but this would cause sensitization to the D antigen, and a female patient would become at risk for hemolytic disease of the newborn.  If a D-negative patient has developed anti-D antibodies, a subsequent exposure to D-positive blood would lead to a potentially dangerous transfusion reaction. Rh D-positive blood should never be given to D-negative women of child-bearing age or to patients with D antibodies, so blood banks must conserve Rh-negative blood for these patients. In extreme circumstances, such as for a major bleed when stocks of D-negative blood units are very low at the blood bank, D-positive blood might be given to D-negative females above child-bearing age or to Rh-negative males, providing that they did not have anti-D antibodies, to conserve D-negative blood stock in the blood bank. The converse is not true; Rh D-positive patients do not react to D negative blood.

This same matching is done for other antigens of the Rh system as C, c, E and e and for other blood group systems with a known risk for immunization such as the Kell system in particular for females of child-bearing age or patients with known need for many transfusions.

Plasma compatibility

Blood plasma compatibility is the inverse of red blood cell compatibility. Type AB plasma carries neither anti-A nor anti-B antibodies and can be transfused to individuals of any blood group; but type AB patients can only receive type AB plasma. Type O carries both antibodies, so individuals of blood group O can receive plasma from any blood group, but type O plasma can be used only by type O recipients.

Table note
1. Assuming absence of strong atypical antibodies in donor plasma

Rh D antibodies are uncommon, so generally neither D negative nor D positive blood contain anti-D antibodies.  If a potential donor is found to have anti-D antibodies or any strong atypical blood group antibody by antibody screening in the blood bank, they would not be accepted as a donor (or in some blood banks the blood would be drawn but the product would need to be appropriately labeled); therefore, donor blood plasma issued by a blood bank can be selected to be free of D antibodies and free of other atypical antibodies, and such donor plasma issued from a blood bank would be suitable for a recipient who may be D positive or D negative, as long as blood plasma and the recipient are ABO compatible.

Universal donors and universal recipients

In transfusions of packed red blood cells, individuals with type O Rh D negative blood are often called universal donors. Those with type AB Rh D positive blood are called universal recipients. However, these terms are only generally true with respect to possible reactions of the recipient's anti-A and anti-B antibodies to transfused red blood cells, and also possible sensitization to Rh D antigens. One exception is individuals with hh antigen system (also known as the Bombay phenotype) who can only receive blood safely from other hh donors, because they form antibodies against the H antigen present on all red blood cells.

Blood donors with exceptionally strong anti-A, anti-B or any atypical blood group antibody may be excluded from blood donation. In general, while the plasma fraction of a blood transfusion may carry donor antibodies not found in the recipient, a significant reaction is unlikely because of dilution.

Additionally, red blood cell surface antigens other than A, B and Rh D, might cause adverse reactions and sensitization, if they can bind to the corresponding antibodies to generate an immune response.  Transfusions are further complicated because platelets and white blood cells (WBCs) have their own systems of surface antigens, and sensitization to platelet or WBC antigens can occur as a result of transfusion.

For transfusions of plasma, this situation is reversed.  Type O plasma, containing both anti-A and anti-B antibodies, can only be given to O recipients.  The antibodies will attack the antigens on any other blood type.  Conversely, AB plasma can be given to patients of any ABO blood group, because it does not contain any anti-A or anti-B antibodies.

Blood typing

Typically, blood type tests are performed through addition of a blood sample to a solution containing antibodies corresponding to each antigen. The presence of an antigen on the surface of the blood cells is indicated by agglutination.

Blood group genotyping
In addition to the current practice of serologic testing of blood types, the progress in molecular diagnostics allows the increasing use of blood group genotyping. In contrast to serologic tests reporting a direct blood type phenotype, genotyping allows the prediction of a phenotype based on the knowledge of the molecular basis of the currently known antigens. This allows a more detailed determination of the blood type and therefore a better match for transfusion, which can be crucial in particular for patients with needs for many transfusions to prevent allo-immunization.

History
Blood types were first discovered by an Austrian physician, Karl Landsteiner, working at the Pathological-Anatomical Institute of the University of Vienna (now Medical University of Vienna). In 1900, he found that blood sera from different persons would clump together (agglutinate) when mixed in test tubes, and not only that, some human blood also agglutinated with animal blood. He wrote a two-sentence footnote:

This was the first evidence that blood variation exists in humans. The next year, in 1901, he made a definitive observation that blood serum of an individual would agglutinate with only those of certain individuals. Based on this he classified human bloods into three groups, namely group A, group B, and group C. He defined that group A blood agglutinates with group B, but never with its own type. Similarly, group B blood agglutinates with group A. Group C blood is different in that it agglutinates with both A and B. This was the discovery of blood groups for which Landsteiner was awarded the Nobel Prize in Physiology or Medicine in 1930. (C was later renamed to O after the German Ohne, meaning without, or zero, or null.) Another group (later named AB) was discovered a year later by Landsteiner's students Adriano Sturli and Alfred von Decastello without designating the name (simply referring it to as "no particular type"). Thus, after Landsteiner, three blood types were initially recognised, namely A, B, and C.

Czech serologist Jan Janský was the first to recognise and designate four blood types in 1907 that he published in a local journal, using the Roman numerical I, II, III, and IV (corresponding to modern O, A, B, and AB respectively). Unknown to Janský, an American physician William L. Moss introduced almost identical classification in 1910; but his I and IV corresponding Janský's IV and I. Moss came across Janský's paper as his was being printed, mentioned it in a footnote. Thus the existence of two systems immediately created confusion and potential danger in medical practice. Moss's system was adopted in Britain, France, and the US, while Janský's was preferred in most other European countries and some parts of the US. It was reported that "The practically universal use of the Moss classification at that time was completely and purposely cast aside. Therefore in place of bringing order out of chaos, chaos was increased in the larger cities." To resolve the confusion, the American Association of Immunologists, the Society of American Bacteriologists, and the Association of Pathologists and Bacteriologists made a joint recommendation in 1921 that the Jansky classification be adopted based on priority. But it was not followed particularly where Moss's system had been used.

In 1927, Landsteiner, who had moved to the Rockefeller Institute for Medical Research in New York, and as a member of a committee of the National Research Council concerned with blood grouping suggested to substitute Janský's and Moss's systems with the letters O, A, B, and AB. There was another confusion on the use of O which was introduced by Polish physicians Ludwik Hirszfeld and German physician Emil von Dungern in 1910. It was never clear whether it was meant for the figure 0, German null for zero or the upper case letter O for ohne, meaning without; Landsteiner chose the latter.

In 1928 the Permanent Commission on Biological Standardization adopted Landsteiner's proposal and stated:This classification became widely accepted and after the early 1950s it was universally followed.

Hirszfeld and Dungern discovered the inheritance of blood types as Mendelian genetics in 1910 and the existence of sub-types of A in 1911. In 1927, Landsteiner, with Philip Levine, discovered the MN blood group system, and the P system. Development of the Coombs test in 1945, the advent of transfusion medicine, and the understanding of ABO hemolytic disease of the newborn led to discovery of more blood groups. , the International Society of Blood Transfusion (ISBT) recognizes 43 blood groups.

Society and culture

A popular pseudoscientific belief in Eastern Asian countries (especially in Japan and South Korea) known as 血液型 ketsuekigata / hyeoraekhyeong is that a person's ABO blood type is predictive of their personality, character, and compatibility with others. Researchers have established no scientific basis exists for blood type personality categorization, and studies have found no "significant relationship between personality and blood type, rendering the theory 'obsolete' and concluding that no basis exists to assume that personality is anything more than randomly associated with blood type."

See also
 Blood type (non-human)
 Human leukocyte antigen
 hh blood group

References

Further reading

External links

 BGMUT Blood Group Antigen Gene Mutation Database at NCBI, NIH has details of genes and proteins, and variations thereof, that are responsible for blood types
 
 
 
 
 
 
 

Type
Genetics
Hematology
Transfusion medicine
Antigens